Kazimierz Kmiecik (born 19 September 1951 in Węgrzce Wielkie) is a Polish former international football player who played most of his career for Wisła Kraków, where he played 304 league matches and scored 153 goals. This makes him the best goalscorer in history of the club. He also played for AEL (1982 to 1985) and won the first Greek cup for the history of the team, in 1985. He is today a legend in Larissa and remains a fan favourite.

He played 35 matches and scored eight goals for the Poland national team. He was a participant at the 1972 Summer Olympics, where Poland won the gold medal, the 1974 FIFA World Cup, where Poland won the bronze medal and 1976 Summer Olympics, where Poland won the silver medal.

Several times he was the manager of Wisła Kraków, also temporary. On 14 February 2022, he was confirmed as an assistant coach in Wisła, on the day Jerzy Brzęczek was announced as the main manager.

References

1951 births
Living people
People from Wieliczka County
Sportspeople from Lesser Poland Voivodeship
Polish footballers
Association football forwards
Poland international footballers
1974 FIFA World Cup players
Olympic footballers of Poland
Olympic medalists in football
Medalists at the 1976 Summer Olympics
Medalists at the 1972 Summer Olympics
Olympic gold medalists for Poland
Olympic silver medalists for Poland
Footballers at the 1972 Summer Olympics
Footballers at the 1976 Summer Olympics
Wisła Kraków players
R. Charleroi S.C. players
Athlitiki Enosi Larissa F.C. players
Stuttgarter Kickers players
Offenburger FV players
2. Bundesliga players
Ekstraklasa players
Belgian Pro League players
Polish football managers
Wisła Kraków managers
Polish expatriate footballers
Expatriate footballers in Germany
Expatriate footballers in Belgium
Expatriate footballers in Greece
Polish expatriate sportspeople in Germany
Polish expatriate sportspeople in Belgium
Polish expatriate sportspeople in Greece